Schinia illustra is a moth of the family Noctuidae. It is found in North America, including Colorado, Nevada, New Mexico, Utah and Wyoming.

The wingspan is 24–26 mm.

External links
Images
Butterflies and Moths of North America

Schinia
Moths of North America
Moths described in 1906